Mokissos or Mokisos or Mokison (Μωκισόν) was a town of ancient Cappadocia. The Romans called the city Mocisus or Mocissus, and Mocisum, and after the city was rebuilt by the Byzantine Emperor Justinian (527-565), it was renamed Justinianopolis (Ἰουστινιανούπολις). Justinian made Mocisus the capital of the province of Cappadocia Tertia, and elevated its bishopric to the rank of ecclesiastical metropolis, with an eparchia that stretched south of the Halys River, the longest river of Asia Minor. The name Justinianopolis was retained until the end of Byzantine rule. Stephanus of Byzantium calls the town Moukissos (Μούκισσος). In the Synecdemus, the name appears as Rhegemoukisos (Ῥεγεμουκισός) and Rhegekoukisos (Ῥεγεκουκισός), the later evidently an error. 

Mokissos is also the  formal name for a now inactive Diocese of the Greek Orthodox Church. The current bishop of Mokissos is Demetrios, who is protosyncellus of the Greek Orthodox Metropolis of Chicago.

Its site is located near Vıranşehir, Asiatic Turkey.

References

See also
Churches of Göreme, Turkey

History of Turkey
Ecumenical Patriarchate of Constantinople
Roman towns and cities in Turkey
Ancient Greek archaeological sites in Turkey
Former populated places in Turkey
Buildings and structures in Kırşehir Province
Populated places of the Byzantine Empire
Buildings of Justinian I
Populated places in ancient Cappadocia
History of Kırşehir Province
Titular sees in Asia